Singirikudi or Singarakudi is a revenue village in Cuddalore district of Tamil Nadu, India.

This is one of the Nava-Narasimhar temples of Tamil Nadu which are popular for Lord Narasimha worship. Also, this is one of the 3 temples along with Poovarasankuppam and Parikkal which are being worshipped on the same day by the devotees. The Narasimhar is in Ugra posture killing the demon Hiranya Kasibu on His lap. There are separate shrines for Thayar (Kanakavalli)  and Andal and unusually, they both are facing the opposite direction to that of Lord.

Mythology 

Sage Vasishta who was cursed by King Nimi Chakravarthy, approached his father Brahma and sought his help. Brahma asked him to proceed to Singarkudi and do penance propitiating Narasimha. The sage went to Singarkudi and attained salvation through penance. God Narasimha was pleased with his devotion gave darshan to him. This place is called Singarkudi as the presiding deity is  Singaperumal or Narasimha.  The Lord has 16 hands and looks ferocious. The Lord's birth star Swathi is celebrated on a grand scale. This is a prarthana sthala.

Temple 
On His right side Hiranya's son Prahalad, Sages Sukracharyas and Vasishta are represented. On His left side Hiranyas wife Neelavathy is represented. It appears that such a representation of the deity is there in only two places in India the other being in Rajasthan.

External links 
 Official Web Site of Cuddalore District
 Official website of Tamil Nadu
 Government of Tamil Nadu

References 

Villages in Cuddalore district
Cities and villages in Cuddalore taluk